Common names: desert massasauga, Edward's massasauga, Edward's rattlesnake.

Sistrurus catenatus edwardsii is a subspecies of venomous pit viper in the family Viperidae. The subspecies is endemic to the Southwestern United States and northern Mexico. In places, its range overlaps that of S. c. tergeminus, and intergrading of the two subspecies is known.

Etymology
The subspecific name, edwardsii, is in honor of Colonel Dr. Lewis A. Edwards (1824–1877), a U.S. Army surgeon, who collected the type specimen.

Description
 

Its color pattern consists of a light gray or white base color, with dark gray or gray-brown blotches. It has a distinctive, dark stripe that runs along the side of the head, which passes over the eye. The rattle is significantly higher pitched than those of larger species of rattlesnakes, sometimes giving it the nickname "buzztail".

Compared to S. c. tergeminus, it is paler in color, and its belly is nearly white. Midbody, it has 23 rows of dorsal scales instead of 25, and fewer ventral scales and dorsal blotches.

Geographic range
S. c. edwardsii is found in extreme southeastern Arizona, central and southern New Mexico, West Texas about as far north and east as the Colorado River, in the Rio Grande Valley, in many of the Gulf Coast counties about as far north as Brazoria, and on several barrier islands including North Padre Island, Matagorda Island, and San José Island. In addition, isolated populations have been reported in northeastern Mexico. The type locality is listed as "Tamaulipas ... S. Bank of Rio Grande ... Sonora".

Habitat
S. c. edwardsii  is primarily found in rocky, semiarid, and arid areas. According to Conant (1975), it is mostly found in desert grasslands.

Behavior
This subspecies is primarily nocturnal, especially during the summer, when the weather is too hot for it to be active, but it can sometimes be found basking.

Feeding
The diet of S. c. edwardsii consists primarily of rodents, lizards, and frogs.

Venom
Drop for drop, massasauga venom is more potent than that of many larger species of rattlesnakes, but due to the lower yield (the amount it is capable of delivering in a single bite), its potential for harm is greatly reduced. It is not considered to be deadly, but the venom is a powerful cytotoxic venom that can cause swelling, necrosis, damage to the skin, and severe pain. Medical treatment should be sought immediately for any venomous snake bite. The antivenin CroFab, while not type-specific, can be used to treat severe envenomations from massasaugas.

Conservation status
The desert massasauga is listed as a species of concern in Colorado, due to its limited range in the state, and it is protected by Arizona state law. It is listed as a sensitive species by the United States Forest Service.

References

Further reading

Baird SF, Girard CF (1853). Catalogue of North American Reptiles in the Museum of the Smithsonian Institution, Part I.—Serpents. Washington, District of Columbia: Smithsonian Institution. xvi + 172 pp. (Crotalophorus edwardsii, new species, p. 15.)
Mackessy SP (2005). Desert Massasauga Rattlesnake (Sistrurus catenatus edwardsii): A Technical Conservation Assessment. USDA Forest Service. PDF at USDA Species Conservation Project. Accessed 31 January 2007.
Yarrow HC (1875). "Chapter IV. Report upon the Collections of Batrachians and Reptiles made in Portions of Nevada, Utah, Colorado, New Mexico, and Arizona, during the Years 1871, 1872, 1873, and 1874". pp. 511–584. In: Report upon Geographical and Geological Explorations and Surveys West of the One Hundredth Meridian in Charge of First Lieut. Geo. M. Wheeler, Corps of Engineers, U.S. Army ... Vol. V.—Zoology. Washington, District of Columbia: Secretary of War, U.S. Government. 1,021 pp. (Caudisona edwardsii, pp. 531–532).

External links

 
 Sistrurus catenatus at Herps of Texas . Accessed 31 January 2007.
 Sistrurus catenatus (edwardsii ) at Arizona Parc. Accessed 25 August 2007.
 Sistrurus catenatus edwardsii at California Reptiles and Amphibians. Accessed 25 August 2007.

catenatus edwardsii
Fauna of the Southwestern United States
Reptiles of Mexico
Fauna of the Rio Grande valleys